Hulcote may refer to:
Places
Hulcote, Bedfordshire, a village in Bedfordshire, England
Hulcote, Northamptonshire, England
Hulcote and Salford, a civil parish in Bedfordshire, England
People
William Hulcote, 16th-century member of the English parliament